Manduca occulta, the occult sphinx, is a moth of the family Sphingidae.

Distribution 
The species was first described by Rothschild & Karl Jordan in 1903. It is found from Panama north through Central America (including Belize, Guatemala, Nicaragua and Costa Rica) and Mexico to southern Arizona and on occasion southern Florida.

Description 
The wingspan is 105–120 mm. It is similar to Manduca diffissa tropicalis and can be distinguished only by a study of the genitalia. There are brownish-black bands on the hindwing underside.

Biology 
There is one generation per year in Costa Rica with adults on wing from May to June. In Nicaragua, adults have been recorded from July to August and in October. Strays in Florida have been recorded in September. They feed on the nectar of various flowers.

The larvae feed on Cestrum glanduliferum, Cestrum racemosum, Solanum accrescens and Solanum hazenii.

References

External links
Occult Sphinx Moths of North America

Manduca
Moths described in 1903
Taxa named by Karl Jordan
Taxa named by Walter Rothschild